Barry Tippett (born 16 March 1957) is a former Australian rules footballer who played for the Melbourne Football Club in the Victorian Football League (VFL).

Notes

External links 

1957 births
Living people
Australian rules footballers from Victoria (Australia)
Melbourne Football Club players
Shepparton Football Club players